Eros e Priapo: da furore a cenere is a 1945 satiric pamphlet by Italian author Carlo Emilio Gadda.

Uncensored edition 
An excerpt comparison. The 1967 censored version is shown on the left, the 1945 original uncensored version on the right.

Style and sources
The work framework is an archaic-style prose drawn from the Florentine dialect of Machiavelli, interpolated with the modern vernacular of the Tuscan language, and in a few cases, of modern Lombard language and Romanesco dialect. Gadda said that this parallels what Machiavelli himself did with Tacitus, whose structure he interpolated with jargon from his time.  Another source of archaic Florentine expressions is Benvenuto Cellini.

For the satiric attack, the main influences are the Book of Revelation, for its caricatures against Cesar and Rome, and D'Annunzio's Maia - Laus vitae.

Related works
Some of Gadda's fables present related scatological elements. They are the 111th, 129th, 132nd, 134th, 137th, 138th, 147th and 184th fables of the antifascist cycle.

See also
Grotesque

Notes and references

Further reading
Albert Sbragia Carlo Emilio Gadda and the Modern Macaronic p. 178
Il primo libro delle favole (1952, collection of tales in a mock-antique style)

External links
Chapters 1-3 published in The Edinburgh Journal of Gadda Studies (EJGS)
Wiki Gadda
Paola Italia Mali e rimedi estremi. «Eros e Priapo» 1944-45 comparison of the original incipit and the censored one
Il primo libro delle Favole - a selection

Italian-language literature
1967 essays
1945 essays